Helmarc Academia, is an Angolan semi-professional basketball team. The club made its debut in the Angolan top basketball league in 2018. Helmarc was eight in the 2018–19 season.

Season-by-season

Players

2018

See also
Angolan Basketball League
Federação Angolana de Basquetebol

References

Sports clubs in Angola
Basketball teams in Angola